Hypopyra pudens is a moth of the family Erebidae. It is found in Japan, India (Hindustan), Thailand, Vietnam, Singapore, Taiwan, Borneo, Sumatra and Sulawesi. The habitat ranges from lowland areas, including disturbed and coastal areas, up to 1,618 meters.

The length of the forewings is about 43 mm. The anterior half of the wings is pinkish-orange and the posterior half is coffee-brown.

The larvae feed on Paraserianthes species, including Paraserianthes falcataria (= Falcataria moluccana). They are smoky-grey, with closely spaced, fine, dark speckling over the entire body. The head is pigmented with symmetrical shades of cream and brown. They reach a length of about 56 mm.

References

Moths described in 1913
Hypopyra